John Maynard may refer to:

Politicians
 John Maynard (MP for St Albans) (1509–1556), English MP for St Albans, 1553–1554
 John Maynard (died 1658) (1592–1658), English politician, MP for Lostwithiel, 1646
 John Maynard (1604–1690), English lawyer and politician, MP for Totnes 1640–1653, Plymouth 1656,1679–1685,1689,1690, Bere Alston 1661, 1685 and others 
 John Maynard (died 1662) (1638–1662), English MP for Bere Alston, 1660
 John Maynard (New York politician)  (1786–1850), U.S. Representative from New York

Other people
 John Maynard (cricketer), West Indian cricketer
 John Maynard (civil servant) (1865–1943), British civil servant and political activist
 John Maynard (composer) (born 1570), English madrigalist
 John Maynard (filmmaker), Australian filmmaker, founder of Arenafilms
 John Maynard (historian), Australian historian, grandson of Aboriginal jockey Merv Maynard
 Luther Fuller, also known as John Maynard, helmsman of the steamboat Erie

Literature
 "John Maynard", poem by Horatio Alger, about the helmsman Luther Fuller
 "John Maynard", poem by Theodor Fontane, about the helmsman Luther Fuller

See also
 John Maynard Keynes, British economist
 John Maynard Smith (1920–2004), British theoretical evolutionary biologist and geneticist